KEKO (101.7 FM, "Radio Luz") is a Spanish language Christian formatted radio station licensed to Hebbronville, Texas, area. This station is a repeater of KLIT from Ranchito Las Lomas-Laredo, Texas.

History
KEKO signed on in 1998. In 2004, lightning damage to its transmitter prompted the station to operate at 70 watts. In 2006 and again in 2011, KEKO applied to go silent due to financial difficulties resulting from the reduced power. Once the station got up and running, it lost its transmitter site, prompting a move to a new location.

External links

EKO
Talk radio stations in the United States
EKO
Radio stations established in 2011